Veronika Jeger (born 28 October 1969) is a road cyclist from Hungary. In 2001 and 2004 she won the Hungarian National Road Race Championships. She represented her nation at the 2004 UCI Road World Championships.

References

External links
 profile at Procyclingstats.com

1969 births
Hungarian female cyclists
Living people
Place of birth missing (living people)